In the 1972 World Championship Tennis Finals - Singles, Ken Rosewall was the defending champion, having previously won the tennis competition, and won in the final 4–6, 6–0, 6–3, 6–7(3–7), 7–6(7–5) against Rod Laver. Of particular note, the final is credited as the "match that made tennis in the United States" because its unprecedented domestic television audience of 23 million fueled a massive increase in the sport's popularity.

Seeds
A champion seed is indicated in bold text while text in italics indicates the round in which that seed was eliminated.

  Rod Laver (final)
  Ken Rosewall (champion)
  Arthur Ashe (semifinals)
  Cliff Drysdale (quarterfinals)
  Marty Riessen (semifinals)
  Tom Okker (quarterfinals)
  Robert Lutz (quarterfinals)
  John Newcombe (quarterfinals)

Draw

References

Singles